The 2009 New York Giants season was the 85th season for the team in the National Football League (NFL). It was the team's final season in Giants Stadium; in 2010, the Giants moved into New Meadowlands Stadium. The Giants hoped to improve upon their 12–4 record, avenge their divisional round loss to the Philadelphia Eagles and make the playoffs for the fifth straight year. Despite starting 5–0 to begin the season, they went 3–8 in their next 11 games and finished 3rd in the NFC East. They were eliminated from playoff contention for the first time since 2004 in Week 16, after the Packers and Cowboys both won. They played teams from the NFC South and AFC West as per the schedule rotation, as well as their regular games with their NFC East rivals. For head coach Tom Coughlin, this was his 6th season as the coach of the Giants. This season also saw the Giants play on Thanksgiving for the first time since 1992. They lost to the Denver Broncos 26-6.

Players

Movement
The Giants signed free-agent defensive end Chris Canty, formerly of the Dallas Cowboys, on March 1, 2009. Canty moved to defensive tackle in the Giants' 4–3 scheme. On April 3, 2009, the Giants released WR Plaxico Burress.

Free agents

2009 NFL Draft

After finishing the 2008 season with a 12–4 record, the Giants held the 29th selection in the 2009 NFL Draft. With the pick they closed the gap left by Plaxico Burress in the roster, selecting wide receiver Hakeem Nicks of North Carolina. Then in the second round, they selected linebacker Clint Sintim of Virginia with the 45th pick and offensive tackle William Beatty of Connecticut with the 60th pick. Early in the second day of the draft, the Giants traded picks 91 of Round 3 and 164 of Round 5 to Philadelphia Eagles for their pick 85 of Round 3. With this pick the Giants selected another wide receiver, Ramses Barden of Cal Poly. In the same round they selected tight end Travis Beckum of Wisconsin with the 100th pick of the draft. In the following rounds they selected running back Andre Brown of North Carolina State with the 129th pick in fourth round, quarterback Rhett Bomar of Sam Houston State with the 151st pick in the fifth round, defensive back DeAndre Wright of New Mexico with the 200th pick in the sixth round and with their final pick in the seventh round they selected another defensive back, Stoney Woodson of South Carolina with pick 238.

NOTES:
 Pick 100 is a compensatory selection awarded by the league.
 The Giants received the second and fifth-round selections of the New Orleans Saints for tight end Jeremy Shockey.
 The Giants traded Pick 91, Round 3 and Pick 164, Round 5 to Philadelphia for Pick 85, Round 3.

Undrafted free agents
Following the 2009 NFL Draft, the Giants signed 9 undrafted free agents. They were:

Training Camp Roster

Final roster

Staff

Staff changes
 On January 19, 2009, after 4 years as linebackers coach, the Giants promoted Bill Sheridan to defensive coordinator as replacement to Steve Spagnuolo who was hired by the St. Louis Rams as their new head coach two days earlier.
 On January 22, 2009, the Giants hired Jim Herrmann as new linebackers coach. He spent the last three years at the same position in the New York Jets. Herrmann is the replacement of Bill Sheridan, who was promoted to defensive coordinator.
 On January 23, 2009, the Giants hired Jack Bicknell, Jr. as new assistant offensive line coach. He spent the last two years as offensive line coach for Boston College. Bicknell succeeds Dave DeGuglielmo, coach between 2005 and 2008, who left the Giants to become the new offensive line coach of the Miami Dolphins.
 On February 9, 2009, the Giants hired Al Holcomb as the new defensive quality control coach. He spent the last three years as defensive line coach in the Lafayette College. Holcomb succeeds Andre Curtis, who left the Giants to become the new safeties coach in the staff of Steve Spagnuolo at the St. Louis Rams.

Staff

Schedule

Preseason

Regular season

Standings

Regular season results

Week 1: vs. Washington Redskins

The Giants' season began on a down note, as punt returner/running back DJ Ware dislocated his elbow returning the opening kickoff. The injury bug would later notably strike first-round draft pick Hakeem Nicks, who suffered a sprained foot in the fourth quarter and was carted off the field.

Wide receiver Mario Manningham caught the game's first touchdown in the second quarter; the 30-yard strike was worth more yardage than Manningham had totalled in the entire 2008 season. Later in the quarter, Giants defensive end Osi Umenyiora returned a Jason Campbell fumble 37 yards for a touchdown, his first major play since returning from the knee injury that benched him for all of 2008. Just before halftime, Redskins punter Hunter Smith ran a fake field goal into the end zone to bring the halftime score to 17–7. The Giants did not score a touchdown in the second half, but two Lawrence Tynes field goals ensured that Campbell's late touchdown pass to Chris Cooley would not spoil the Giants' final home opener at Giants Stadium.

The victory served as a sort of going-away party for the Giants, who now faced a rare three-game roadtrip for the first time since 1994.

Week 2: at Dallas Cowboys

In contrast to the teams' previous meeting, the grand opening of Cowboys Stadium (in front of the largest regular-season crowd in NFL history) was a fast-paced shootout. The first points in the Cowboys' new home were scored by Tynes, whose 30-yard field goal in the first quarter was his first of four on the night. The Cowboys responded by scoring their first points on the ensuing drive—a 2-yard run by running back Marion Barber.

Giants rookie cornerback Bruce Johnson scored his first career points returning a Tony Romo interception 34 yards. Cowboys tight end Jason Witten responded with a 1-yard touchdown pass in the second quarter. Later, Giants safety Kenny Phillips caught an odd interception off Witten's foot, setting up quarterback Eli Manning's 100th career touchdown pass—a 22-yard strike to Manningham. Romo ran a quarterback sneak to open the scoring in the second half, but the Giants sent wide receiver Steve Smith into the end zone in the fourth quarter. The Cowboys punched in one more touchdown on a 7-yard Felix Jones run, but Tynes' 37-yard field goal as time expired was enough to postpone the Cowboys' first home win in Arlington and boost the Giants to 2–0.

The Giants lost two more notable players to injuries; defensive end Justin Tuck suffered a sprained shoulder and wide receiver Domenik Hixon sprained a knee. During the week, Phillips' season was brought to an end, as he was placed on injured reserve with patellofemoral arthritis.

Week 3: at Tampa Bay Buccaneers

Playing in hot, humid Florida weather, the Giants scored on their first possession for the third week in a row. Jacobs' 6-yard run was also the Giants' first red zone touchdown in eight trips this year. After that, the Giants never looked back. They held the Buccaneers to 18 total yards of offense and 0 first downs in the first half. Smith contributed with a 4-yard touchdown catch on the first play of the second quarter. In the fourth quarter, Sinorice Moss' first reception of the year was good for an 18-yard touchdown. The game ended with David Carr at quarterback for the Giants and Josh Johnson relieving Tampa Bay quarterback Byron Leftwich, whom the Giants' defense held to just 22 passing yards on the day. The Giants had pitched their first shutout on the road since 1983.

Week 4: at Kansas City Chiefs

The Giants were in control of the winless Chiefs from the opening kickoff, which Bryan Kehl recovered after a Jamaal Charles fumble. The Giants proceeded to score on their first possession for the fourth straight week, this time on a short pass to Smith. Smith himself went on to have a busy day, with 11 catches for 134 yards and a 25-yard touchdown in the second quarter as well. Nicks returned from his Week 1 injury and scored his first career touchdown, a 54-yard pass from Manning, in the fourth quarter. Late in the game, the Chiefs put up a brief flurry of offense; quarterback Matt Cassel threw touchdowns to tight end Sean Ryan and wide receiver Bobby Wade within a span of about five minutes. But the comeback fell short, and the Giants improved to 4–0.

Manning suffered a heel injury in the fourth quarter, and was forced to leave the game early. Initially concerned about a possible Achilles tendon injury, he was later diagnosed with plantar fasciitis; his start against the Raiders was to be a game-time decision.

Week 5: vs. Oakland Raiders

Manning ended up playing until late in the second quarter before handing over the reins—and another Giants blowout lead—to Carr. The Giants extended their first-possession scoring streak to five games, sending Ahmad Bradshaw into the end zone for his first touchdown of the year. The Giants proceeded to score touchdowns on each of their next three drives as well: Bradshaw scored again on a 19-yard rush; Manningham caught a 30-yard touchdown pass to open the second quarter; and, following a red zone fumble by Oakland quarterback JaMarcus Russell, Nicks added a 9-yard touchdown reception. In the third quarter, Carr himself ran 12 yards for his first rushing touchdown since leaving the Houston Texans. The Raiders were held to just 7 first downs on the day, their only touchdown coming on the heels of a muffed punt by Moss.

The win handed the Giants their first 5–0 start since their Super Bowl-winning year of 1990.

Week 6: at New Orleans Saints

The Giants' first loss of the year came in this much-anticipated "clash of unbeatens" against a 4–0 New Orleans team. Manning's first NFL game in his hometown of New Orleans was also Saints tight end Jeremy Shockey's first game against his former team.

The Giants' defense, which entered the game as the best in the NFL, gave up 493 total yards and 7 touchdowns to seven different Saints, including Shockey. Scoring touchdowns for the Giants were: Bradshaw, on a 10-yard run in the second quarter; Manningham, who caught a 15-yard pass later in the quarter; and Nicks, whose 37-yard reception from Carr earned him his first career 100-yard receiving game. But the Giants were unable to overcome their highest-scoring opponent since 1999.

Week 7: vs. Arizona Cardinals

Led by former Giant Kurt Warner, the defending NFC champions took the field at Giants Stadium against a Giants team still reeling from their bad loss in New Orleans. The Giants scored first, sending Jacobs in for a 4-yard touchdown run following a Terrell Thomas interception. Later, Arizona running back Beanie Wells scored his first career touchdown on a 13-yard rush. Manning responded by throwing a 62-yard touchdown to Nicks for his longest reception of the year. In the second half, the Cardinals' Tim Hightower and Jason Wright scored touchdowns. But it was turnovers that decided this game; Manning's 3 interceptions were as many as he had thrown all season. The Giants scored only 3 points in the second half, ending the game on an interception to Antrel Rolle.

The Giants notable streak of 38 consecutive starts by the same offensive line unit was ended here, as offensive tackle Kareem McKenzie missed the game with a groin injury. McKenzie returned the following week.

With the loss, The Giants fell to 5–2.

Week 8: at Philadelphia Eagles

This game was originally scheduled at 4:15 pm; however, because the Philadelphia Phillies were hosting Game 4 of the World Series that night the NFL moved the start time to 1:00 pm.

Trying to end a two-game losing streak, the Giants went into Lincoln Financial Field for a crucial Week 8 game with the Philadelphia Eagles, as the divisional lead was up for grabs.

New York trailed greatly in the first quarter as Eagles fullback Leonard Weaver got a 41-yard touchdown run, followed by quarterback Donovan McNabb's 17-yard touchdown pass to tight end Brent Celek (with a blocked PAT). Philadelphia would add onto their lead in the second quarter with a 30-yard field goal from kicker David Akers. The Giants would get on the board as quarterback Eli Manning found tight end Kevin Boss on an 18-yard touchdown pass, but the Eagles continued their scoring as McNabb completed a 54-yard touchdown pass to wide receiver DeSean Jackson and a 23-yard touchdown pass to wide receiver Jeremy Maclin.

Philadelphia would begin the third quarter with an increase to their lead as Akers nailed a 35-yard field goal. New York tried to rally as kicker Lawrence Tynes booted a 35-yard field goal, followed by running back Ahmad Bradshaw. However, the Eagles would seal the win in the fourth quarter as running back LeSean McCoy got a 66-yard touchdown run.

With their third-straight loss, the Giants fell to 5–3.

Week 9: vs. San Diego Chargers

This game was the much-hyped first-ever meeting between Manning and Philip Rivers, the two quarterbacks drafted, then traded, during the 2004 NFL Draft.

The Chargers struck first, as Rivers connected with Vincent Jackson in the end zone to open the second quarter. Manning responded with a 6-yard touchdown pass to Smith that capped off a 16-play, 10:35 drive. In the third quarter, Rivers found tight end Kris Wilson in the end zone for Wilson's first touchdown since 2007. The Giants responded with a Tynes field goal and then an 8-yard touchdown to Boss. After a defensive stop by the Chargers that held the Giants to a field goal from the 4-yard line, Rivers led his team 80 yards in the final two minutes and threw Jackson the winning score with twenty-one seconds remaining on the clock. The Giants had lost despite controlling the ball for 37:47 and holding the Chargers to 34 rushing yards.

The 5–4 Giants had dropped four straight for the first time since 2006, and headed into their bye week.

Week 11: vs. Atlanta Falcons

The Giants had not beaten the Falcons at home in five tries since 1979, but it was a must-win game this time. The Giants were missing veteran linebacker Antonio Pierce, who was nursing a bulging disc in his neck, and the Falcons' star running back Michael Turner was also out with a high ankle sprain.

The Giants took an early lead on Tynes' first-quarter field goal, but the Falcons responded with third-string running back Jason Snelling's 7-yard touchdown run. Boss caught two touchdown passes in the second quarter, one of them from 28 yards out. In the third quarter, Snelling and Jacobs traded short touchdown runs. Giants fullback Madison Hedgecock opened the scoring in the fourth quarter by catching his first touchdown of the season, but Falcons receiver Eric Weems caught his second of the year on the ensuing drive. In a sort of déjà vu moment for the Giants, another opponent's comeback took them right up until the final minute; tight end Tony Gonzalez caught the tying touchdown with 35 seconds left in regulation. The Giants won the overtime coin toss, and then drove 45 yards to set up Tynes' winning field goal, ending the Giants' skid at 4 games.

Week 12: at Denver Broncos

Coming off their overtime win to the Falcons, the Giants flew for a Week 12 interconference game against the Denver Broncos, their first Thanksgiving game since 1992.

In the first quarter the Giants trailed early with kicker Matt Prater making a 26-yard field goal and then a 32-yard field goal in the second quarter. The Broncos kept on top with RB Knowshon Moreno making a 1-yard touchdown run. After that Matt Prater made a 47-yard field goal to end the half. In the third quarter the Giants replied with kicker Lawrence Tynes nailing a 39 then a 52-yard field goal. In the fourth quarter New York fell further behind with QB Kyle Orton making a 17-yard touchdown pass to WR Brandon Stokley, and Prater making a 24-yard field goal.

With the loss, the Giants fell to 6–5.

Week 13: vs. Dallas Cowboys

The rematch of these division rivals was a must-win game for the Giants in a season where every game was quickly becoming a must-win game for the Giants. A win would keep alive the Giants' hopes of winning the NFC East.

Dallas receiver Roy Williams scored the game's first touchdown in the second quarter, on a 4-yard pass from Romo. Manning responded with a 21-yard shot to Nicks on the ensuing drive. On the Cowboys' next possession, Umenyiora picked up a Marion Barber fumble, which Jacobs later turned into a 1-yard touchdown run. In the third quarter, Romo found Williams in the end zone again, this time for 5 yards. But on the next play from scrimmage, Jacobs caught a 74-yard touchdown for the longest reception of his career. Another Giant set a personal record in the fourth quarter; Hixon's 79-yard punt return was the longest of his career, and it resulted in his second career return touchdown. In a late rally by the Cowboys, Miles Austin caught a 22-yard touchdown pass from Romo, but the ensuing onside kick resulted in a penalty on Sam Hurd for illegal touching and the Giants ran out the clock. The Giants had swept the Cowboys for the first time since 2004, and were now only one game behind in the division standings.

Week 14: vs. Philadelphia Eagles

The winner of this Sunday Night showdown would assume first place in the NFC East (the Eagles outright, the Giants on tiebreakers). With two games against opponents with losing records approaching, it was crucial for the Giants to escape this one with a win.

The Eagles started things off right away, putting 14 points on the board before the Giants had run their fifth play from scrimmage. McNabb connected with Celek for a touchdown, and Sheldon Brown returned a Brandon Jacobs fumble for six points on the ensuing drive. In the second quarter, Nicks caught the longest reception of his short career for a 68-yard touchdown. After DeSean Jackson responded by returning a Jeff Feagles punt 72 yards for a touchdown, the Giants were able to send Bradshaw into the end zone from the 3. Eagles backup quarterback Michael Vick was able to sneak in one more rushing touchdown before halftime. Jacobs opened the scoring in the second half with a 1-yard rush. After the teams traded turnovers, Manning got the ball into Hixon's hands for a 61-yard touchdown. But the Eagles responded on the very next play with a 60-yard touchdown to Jackson. Jackson's 176 receiving yards amounted to the best individual receiving performance against the Giants since 2002. The Eagles struck again in the fourth quarter, this time on a run by fullback Leonard Weaver and a two-point conversion pass to Jason Avant. The Giants put another touchdown on the board (courtesy of Boss) in the last two minutes of the game, and got the ball back with 28 seconds left. But defensive end Darren Howard sacked Manning and forced a fumble, sealing the Eagles' first sweep of the Giants since 2004.

The Giants had given up 85 points to the Eagles this year, the most they had ever given up to the Eagles in a single season in franchise history, including four playoff years where they met the Eagles a third time. The Giants' 38 points were also the most scored by a losing team since Week 2 of 2008.

Week 15: at Washington Redskins

The Giants needed wins to keep their playoff hopes alive, and this Monday night matchup against the underachieving Redskins seemed a prime opportunity.

The Giants' first two possessions ended in touchdown runs by Bradshaw of 3 and 4 yards. Later in the second quarter, Manning found Smith in the end zone for a 6-yard score. The normally-lackluster Giants defense succeeded in holding the Redskins to 2 first downs and no points in the first half. The Redskins opened the scoring in the second half with an 11-yard touchdown strike from Campbell to tight end Fred Davis, but Graham Gano's extra point was blocked by Fred Robbins. Manning responded by throwing receiver Derek Hagan his first touchdown as a Giant, a 23-yard pass. On the next play from scrimmage, Thomas intercepted a Campbell pass and returned it 14 yards for a touchdown. Quinton Ganther, starting at running back in place of the injured Clinton Portis, gave the Redskins another touchdown late in the third quarter, but could not get into the end zone on the two-point conversion attempt. Manning threw one more touchdown pass to Manningham in the fourth quarter, which boosted the Giants to their highest point total on the road since 1954. The Giants were still very much in the playoff picture, and hoping for losses by the Cowboys and Packers.

Week 16: vs. Carolina Panthers

This was the last game the Giants would ever play at the moribund Giants Stadium, but they had no time to be nostalgic—defeating the same Week 16 opponent they faced last year would make their path to the postseason slightly easier.

The Panthers, starting Matt Moore at quarterback in place of the injured Jake Delhomme, quickly took control of the game, scoring on their first four possessions (a 38-yard John Kasay field goal; a 29-yard Jonathan Stewart touchdown run; a 22-yard Muhsin Muhammad touchdown catch; and a 2-yard catch for tight end Jeff King). Meanwhile, the Giants turned the ball over 3 times in the first half, and were shut out at halftime for the second time this season. In the third quarter, Carolina picked up where they left off, as Moore connected with Carolina's Steve Smith for a 27-yard score. The Giants finally got on the board on the ensuing drive, courtesy of a 40-yard Tynes field goal. In the fourth quarter, the Giants' Smith caught a 2-yard touchdown pass from Manning, but a subsequent 2-point try failed. Carolina fullback Brad Hoover's 1-yard scoring run later in the fourth sealed the game for the Panthers. The Giants left Giants Stadium the same way they had opened it 33 years earlier; with a demoralizing loss.

The loss, along with wins by the Cowboys and Packers this week, mathematically eliminated the Giants from the postseason, breaking their streak of 4 consecutive playoff appearances. Curiously, the last NFL game at Giants Stadium would not be a Giants game, but a Jets game; the Jets would play the Cincinnati Bengals at home on Sunday night in Week 17.

Week 17: at Minnesota Vikings

The Giants wrapped up their 2009 campaign against Brett Favre, a quarterback they last saw on their way to Super Bowl XLII. This time, however, Favre led a convincing rout of the Giants, as they allowed 40 points to an opponent for the fifth time this season. Scoring touchdowns for Minnesota were former Giant Visanthe Shiancoe, Pro Bowlers Adrian Peterson and Sidney Rice (twice), and fullback Naufahu Tahi. A 1-yard touchdown run by Ware in the fourth quarter prevented the Giants from being shut out. Center Shaun O'Hara was named to the Pro Bowl in the week leading up to the game.

The 2009 Giants became the eighth team since the 1970 AFL-NFL merger to miss the playoffs after starting the season 5–0, and the first NFC team since the Vikings in 2003.

References

External links

2009 New York Giants season at Pro Football Reference
2009 New York Giants season at ESPN

New York Giants
New York Giants seasons
New York Giants season
21st century in East Rutherford, New Jersey
Meadowlands Sports Complex